Essel may refer to:

People
 André Essel (1918–2005), French businessman
 Christian Essel (born 1989), Liberian football player
 Christine Essel, American politician
 Eileen Essell (1922–2015), English actress
 Frank Abor Essel-Cobbah, Ghanaian politician
 Joseph Ampah Kojo Essel, Ghanaian politician

Places
 Essel, Lower Saxony, Germany

Other
 Essel, French former glasses manufacturer, now part of Essilor
 Essel Group, Indian conglomerate